Expedition of Abdullah ibn Rawaha to Khaybar, took place in February 628 AD. Ibn Hisham also refers to this as Abdullah b. Rawaha's raid to kill al-Yusayr b. Rizam.

The assassination was successful, and ibn Rizam was killed as well as 29 of his followers.

Assassination of Al-Yusayr ibn Rizam
The assassination of Abu Rafi did not relieve Muhammad of his apprehensions. Muhammad did not feel safe from the Jews of Khaybar.

Al-Yusayr ibn Rizam was elected the new chief of the Khaybar Jews. He maintained the same good relations with the Banu Ghatafan that his predecessor Abu Rafi had. Muhammad heard that Al-Yusayr ibn Rizam was planning a fresh attack against him. So he deputed Abdallah ibn Rawaha, a leader of the Banu Khazraj, and sent him with three followers to Khaybar to gather intelligence on how Al-Yusayr may be taken unaware and assassinated.

But Abdullah ibn Rawaha found the Jews to be extremely alert for this second assassination to be a success. When he returned to Medina a new strategy was devised, Muhammad again sent him openly with 30 men mounted on camels to persuade al-Yusayr to visit Medina. When they arrived, they assured Yusayr they will make him the ruler of Khaybar and would treat him well, giving al-Yusayr ibn Rizam a solemn guarantee of his safety.

So he was mounted on the horse of Abdullah ibn Unais and the Muslims rode behind him. When they arrived at al-Qarqarat, about six miles from Khaybar, al-Yusayr suspected the plans of the Muslims and changed his mind about going to meet Muhammad. He dismounted from the beast he was riding with Abdullah ibn Unais. Abdullah ibn Unais perceived that al-Yusayr was drawing his sword. So he rushed at him and hit him with a deadly blow on his hip joint.  Al-Yusayr fell wounded on the floor but hit Abdullah ibn Unais and wounded him with a camel staff, the only weapon within his reach.

This was a signal for the Muslims to attack, each of the Muslims killed the Jews on the camels in front of them, one behind the other. The Muslims killed all the Jews, except one who escaped.

Islamic primary sources
The Sunni hadith collection Sunan al-Tirmidhi no. 3923 mentions that Muhammad sent a detachment under Abdullah ibn Rawaha:

Musnad Ahmad ibn Hanbal 2:1966 also mentioned this incident.

See also
 Military career of Muhammad
List of expeditions of Muhammad

References

628
Campaigns ordered by Muhammad